The TMF Awards were an annual television awards show broadcast live on TMF (The Music Factory).

The first Dutch TMF Awards were held in 1995, as a brand extension to the recently launched local Dutch music channel TMF. The show was very small and held in the company cafeteria. However throughout the years the event gradually moved to bigger venues, and for some time now, it is now being held in Rotterdam Ahoy, a venue which can seat 10,000 people. In 2006, the show was held in the 'Heineken Music Hall' in Amsterdam.

Since 1998 (with the arrival of the Belgian channel, broadcasting in Dutch, purely for the Flemish part of the country) a second TMF Awards show was launched. It started out in a local Antwerp Disco called 'Zillion' (which no longer exists, for a crowd of 2,000 people), and gradually moved to Flanders Expo in Gent (for a crowd of 8,000 people). The past couple of years leading up to 2007, the Belgian edition has surpassed the Dutch edition after it moved to the Sportpaleis Merksem in Antwerp (for a crowd of 17,000 people). In 2007, the TMF awards moved to the Ethias Arena in Hasselt (for a crowd of 21,600 people.)

Both the Dutch & Belgian TMF Awards were broadcast live in Belgium (Flanders) and the Netherlands. About a week later, they were shown on TMF UK. The Dutch show usually took place in April; the Belgian show in October. In 2006 both shows were held in October.

Winners (Belgium)

2009

National awards
 Best Video: Jasper Erkens-Waiting Like a Dog
 Best Urban: Hadise
 Best Album: Sylver - Sacrifice
 Best Male Artist: Jasper Erkens
 Best Female Artist: Natalia
 Best Pop: Clouseau
 Best Rock: Nailpin
 Best Dance: Milk Inc.
 Best Live: Milk Inc.
 Best New Artist: Jasper Erkens

International awards
 Best Video: Jonas Brothers - Paranoid
 Best Urban: The Black Eyed Peas
 Best Album: The Black Eyed Peas - The E.N.D.
 Best Male Artist: Justin Timberlake
 Best Female Artist: Lady Gaga
 Best Pop: Lady Gaga
 Best Rock: Kings of Leon
 Best Dance: Bob Sinclar
 Best Live: Beyoncé
 Best New Artist: Lady Gaga

First named is the best national nominee, second was best international one.

2008

 Best Rock: Nailpin, Fall Out Boy
 Best Dance: Milk Inc., Tocadisco
 Best Live: Milk Inc., Fall Out Boy
 Best Alternative: The Black Box Revelation, Fall Out Boy
 Best Male Artist: Koen Buyse, Bill Kaulitz
 Best Female Artist: Natalia, Rihanna
 Best Pop: Natalia, Mika
 Best Urban: Brahim, Kat DeLuna
 Best Album: Milk Inc. (with Forever), Coldplay (with Viva la vida)
 Best New Artist: The Ditch, Kat DeLuna
 Best Video: Nailpin (with The ending), Tokio Hotel (with Don't jump)
 Lifetime Achievement Award: Hooverphonic

2007
 Best Album: Zornik: Crosses, Tokio Hotel: Scream
 Best Alternative: Goose, Fall Out Boy
 Best Dance: Milk Inc., Chemical Brothers
 Best Female Artist: Natalia, Nelly Furtado
 Best Male Artist: Koen Buyse, Justin Timberlake
 Best Live: Zornik, Within Temptation
 Best New Artist: Milow, Tokio Hotel
 Best Pop: Clouseau, Tokio Hotel
 Best Rock: Nailpin,
 Best Urban: Hadise, Timbaland
 Best Video: Zornik: Black Hope Shot Down, Tokio Hotel: Monsoon
 Best Game: Singstar Rocks
 Best Bullybeaters Commercial: The Hug
 Lifetime Achievement Award: Clouseau

2006
 Best Video: Nailpin: Worn out, Panic! at the Disco: I write sins not tragedies
 Best Urban: Hadise, Rihanna
 Best Album: Zornik: Alien Sweetheart, Pussycat Dolls: PCD
 Best Male Artist: Koen Buyse, Justin Timberlake
 Best Female Artist: Katerine, Kelly Clarkson
 Best Pop: Katerine, Kelly Clarkson
 Best Rock: Zornik, Red Hot Chili Peppers
 Best Dance: Milk Inc., Bob Sinclar
 Best Live: Zornik, Anouk
 Best Alternative: dEUS, Panic! at the Disco
 Best New Artist: Udo, The Veronicas
 Best Game: Singstar Rocks
 Totally TMF Award for Outstanding Achievement in Music: Tiësto

2005
 Best Female Artist: Anastacia, Belle Perez, Anouk
 Best Male Artist: Koen Wauters, Marco Borsato
 Best Rock: Zornik, Green Day
 Best Pop: Natalia, Gwen Stefani
 Best Urban: 't Hof van Commerce, The Black Eyed Peas
 Best Dance: Milk Inc., Faithless
 Best Video: Stash (with Sadness), Anouk (with Girl)
 Best Ringtone: Dave McCullen (with B*tch)
 Best Album: Natalia (with Back For More), Anouk (with Hotel New York)
 Best DJ: DJ Wout, Tiësto
 Best New Artist: Katerine, Kelly Clarkson
 Best Game: De Sims 2
 Radio Donna Award for best Single: Sandrine (with Goosebumps)

2004
 Beste zangeres: Natalia, Anastacia
 Beste zanger: Koen Wauters, Marco Borsato
 Meest beloved: Leki, Jamelia
 Beste dj: 2 Many DJs, Tiësto
 Beste R&B/rap: Leki, Usher
 Beste dance: Milk Inc., Freestylers
 Beste pop: Natalia, Anastacia
 Beste rock: Zornik, Evanescence
 Beste live-act: Clouseau, N.E.R.D.
 Beste album: Novastar (with Another Lonely Soul), The Black Eyed Peas (with Elephunk)
 Beste clip: Zornik (with Scared Of Yourself), The Black Eyed Peas (with Shut Up)
 Radio Donna award voor beste single: Freestylers (with Push up)
 Lifetime achievement Milk Inc.

2003
 Best zangeres: Sarah Bettens, Christina Aguilera
 Best zanger: Koen Wauters, Robbie Williams
 Best pop: Clouseau, Steps
 Best rock: Janez Detd., U2
 Best live-act: Clouseau, The Offspring
 Best R&B/rap: 't Hof van Commerce, Will Smith
 Best dance: Milk Inc., Basement Jaxx
 Meest belovend: Brahim, Westlife
 Best album: Janez Detd. (for Anti Anthem), Christina Aguilera (for  Stripped)
 Best single: Jasper Steverlinck (Life On Mars)
 Best video: Sylver (for Why Worry), Christina Aguilera (for Fighter)

2002
 Best zangeres: Anastacia, Kate Ryan, Jennifer Lopez
 Best zanger: Koen Wauters, Jon Bon Jovi
 Best pop: Clouseau, Atomic Kitten
 Best rock: Zornik, Within Temptation
 Best R&B/rap: 't Hof van Commerce, Eminem
 Best dance: Milk Inc., Faithless
 Meest belovend: Flesh And Bones, Avril Lavigne
 Best dj: 2 Many DJs, Tiësto
 Best clip: Kate Ryan (for Desenchantée), Avril Lavigne (for Complicated)

2001
 Beste zangeres: Geike (of Hooverphonic), Jennifer Lopez
 Beste zanger: Gene (of X-Session), Robbie Williams
 Beste single: Anastacia (with I'm Outta Love), Lasgo (with Something), Faithless (with We Come 1)
 Beste pop: X-Session, Atomic Kitten
 Beste rock: Das Pop, U2
 Beste live-act: Hooverphonic, Faithless
 Beste R&B/rap: ABN, Destiny's Child
 Beste dance: Milk Inc., Faithless
 Meest belovend: Zornik, Blue
 Beste album: Hooverphonic (with The Magnificent Tree), Destiny's Child (with Survivor)
 Beste clip: Milk Inc. with Never Again, Christina, Mýa, Pink & Lil' Kim with "Lady Marmalade"

2000
 Beste zangeres: Sarah Bettens, Britney Spears
 Beste zanger: Jasper Steverlinck (of Arid), Ronan Keating
 Beste single: Milk Inc. (met Walk On Water), Bomfunk MC's (with Freestyler)
 Beste pop: X-Session, Westlife
 Beste rock: Soulwax, Live
 Beste live-act: Praga Khan, Live
 Beste R&B/rap: ABN, Destiny's Child
 Beste dance: Da Boy Tommy, Alice DeeJay
 Meest belovend: Janez Detd., Krezip
 Beste album: Novastar (met Novastar), Moby (with Play)
 Beste clip: Soulwax (met Much Against Everyone's Advice), Aqua (with Cartoon Heroes)

1999
 Beste zangeres: Sarah Bettens, Britney Spears
 Beste zanger: Koen Wauters, Robbie Williams
 Beste single: Nunca (with House Of Doom), Sasha (with If You Believe)
 Beste pop: Clouseau, Steps
 Beste rock: Soulwax, U2
 Beste live-act: Praga Khan, The Offspring
 Beste R&B/rap: 't Hof van Commerce, Will Smith
 Beste dance: Milk Inc., Basement Jaxx
 Meest belovend: Eden, Westlife
 Beste album: Mackenzie ft. Jessy, The Offspring (with Americana)
 Beste clip: Soulwax (with 2 Many DJs), Will Smith (with Wild Wild West)

Line-up

2008
 Nailpin Openingsact
 Fall Out Boy Slotact
 National: Milow, Natalia, Milk Inc., Brahim, Sandrine, Freaky Age, Kate Ryan, Zornik, Hooverphonic, 2 Fabiola
 International: Alphabeat, Kat DeLuna, Freemasons, Tocadisco, Ironik

2007
 Zornik Openingsact
 Regi feat. Bart Peeters, Scala en Milk Inc. Slotact
 National: Milow, Natalia, Clouseau, Katerine, Hadise, urban medley with Crush 5, Leki, Kaye Styles and Lunaman, Goose, Fixkes, Stan van Samang, Kate Ryan
 International: Tokio Hotel, Avril Lavigne, Lumidee, Within Temptation, Mutya Buena, Air Traffic

Locations

Netherlands 
 1996: Bussum
 1997: Statenhal, The Hague
 1998-2005: Rotterdam Ahoy, Rotterdam
 2006-2007: Heineken Music Hall, Amsterdam
 2009: Erasmusbrug, Rotterdam
 2010: Volkspark, Enschede
 2011: Javakade, Amsterdam

Belgium 
 22 October 1999: Zillion, Antwerp
 28 October 2000: Flanders Expo, Ghent
 27 October 2001: Flanders Expo, Ghent
 28 October 2002: Flanders Expo, Ghent
 27 October 2003: Sportpaleis, Antwerp
 2 October 2004: Sportpaleis, Antwerp
 1 October 2005: Sportpaleis, Antwerp
 14 October 2006: Sportpaleis, Antwerp
 13 October 2007: Ethias Arena, Hasselt
 11 October 2008: Sportpaleis, Antwerp

Presentation

Belgium 
 1999:
 Host: Inge Moerenhout
 Co-Host: Roos Van Acker
 2000:
 Host: Inge Moerenhout
 Co-Host: Elke Vanelderen
 2001:
 Host: Inge Moerenhout
 Co-Host: Stijn Smets
 2002:
 Host: Katja Retsin
 Co-Host: Olivier Coumans
 2003:
 Hosts: Elke Vanelderen & Evi Hanssen
 Co-Host: Caren Meynen
 2004:
 Hosts: Stijn Smets & Leki
 Co-Host: Caren Meynen
 2005:
 Hosts: An Lemmens & Olivier Coumans
 Co-Host: Caren Meynen
 2006:
 Hosts: An Lemmens & Olivier Coumans
 Co-Host: Caren Meynen
 2007:
 Hosts: Lynn Pelgroms & Olivier Coumans
 Co-Hosts: An Lemmens & Sean d'Hondt
 2008:
 Host: Olivier Coumans
 Co-Hosts: Caren Meynen, Sofie Engelen, Wendy Huyghe, Sean d'Hondt, Astrid Demeure, Stijn Smets & Lynn Pelgroms

External links
 Official website of the TMF Awards (Belgium)
 Official website of TMF (Belgium)

Belgian music awards
Annual television shows